is a Pokémon species in Nintendo and Game Freak's Pokémon franchise. Created by Motofumi Fujiwara, it first appeared in the video games Pokémon Red and Blue. It has later appeared in various merchandise, spinoff titles, as well as animated and printed adaptations of the franchise. It is also the game mascot and starter Pokémon for Pokémon: Let's Go, Eevee!

Known as the Evolution Pokémon in the games and the anime, Eevee has an unstable genetic code, which allows it to evolve into one of eight different Pokémon, known as Eeveelutions, depending on the situation. The first three of these evolutions, Vaporeon, Jolteon, and Flareon, were introduced alongside Eevee in Pokémon Red and Blue. Five more evolutions have since been introduced in Pokémon games: Espeon, Umbreon, Leafeon, Glaceon, and Sylveon.

Conception and characteristics
The design for Eevee and its initial evolutions, Jolteon and Flareon, were provided by Japanese graphic designer Motofumi Fujiwara, while fellow graphic designer Atsuko Nishida designed Vaporeon. Ken Sugimori, an illustrator and friend of the Pokémon franchise's creator, Satoshi Tajiri, provided illustrations of Eevee and its evolutions after seeing Fujiwara and Nishida's sprites. According to Fujiwara, he "wanted to create a blank slate Pokémon." Drawing upon his vague childhood memories, including an instance where he became lost in a forest and "encountered an undefinable creature," Fujiwara would go on to create the early design for Eevee, which he likened to "a fluffy cat or dog-like creature one would see in the country."

In the original Japanese games, the Pokémon was called Eievui, a name which has similar prefixes to its current English name. However, before the English versions of the games were released, Eevee was originally going to be named Eon rather than Eevee. It was renamed to "Eevee" shortly before the English releases of Pokémon Red and Blue.

According to the Pokémon video games, Eevee is a mammalian creature with brown fur, a bushy tail that has a cream-colored tip, and a furry collar that is also cream-colored. Eevee has brown eyes, big ears, and pink paw pads. Eevee is said to have an irregularly shaped genetic structure, enabling it to evolve into multiple Pokémon. Eevee are quite rare in the games, but are canonically able to live almost anywhere, as they may evolve to suit their surroundings.

Evolutions
Eevee is best known for being the Pokémon with the most potential evolutions (dubbed "eeveelutions" by fans, though it later came to be used in official capacities), with eight possible evolutionary forms (followed by Tyrogue, with three). In the first generation of Pokemon games where Eevee was introduced, it was also the only to have branched evolutions. All the Eeveelutions were designed by Atsuko Nishida, except for Jolteon and Flareon, which were designed by Motofumi Fujiwara.

Appearances

In the video games
In the Red, Blue, Yellow versions, the player receives one Eevee at the Pokémon Mansion in Celadon City, and they must trade to receive the Pokédex info on the other evolutions (Red, Blue, and Yellow only). In Pokémon Yellow, the player was to receive an Eevee from Professor Oak at the beginning of the game as the player's starter. However, the player's rival decides to take the Eevee before the player can obtain it. Due to this, the player is forced to choose the wild Pikachu that Professor Oak had caught earlier as a starter. The player's rival meanwhile evolves his Eevee into any of the three evolutions available, depending on the outcomes of the player's encounters with him in the early parts of the game. Eevee also appeared on other games such as Pokémon Stadium, Pokémon Gold and Silver, Pokémon Crystal, Pokémon Ruby and Sapphire, Pokémon FireRed and LeafGreen, Pokémon Emerald, Pokémon Platinum, Pokémon HeartGold and SoulSilver, Pokémon Black and White, Pokémon Black 2 and White 2, Pokémon X and Y, Pokémon Omega Ruby and Alpha Sapphire, Pokémon Sun and Moon, Pokémon Ultra Sun and Ultra Moon, Pokémon Sword and Shield as well as the remakes Pokémon Brilliant Diamond and Shining Pearl, where Eevee can be found in the same areas that it was obtained from the original games.

In Pokémon Sun and Moon, Eevee gained access to upgrade the move Last Resort to its exclusive Z-Move, Extreme Evoboost, while holding its unique Z-Crystal Eevium Z. In Pokémon Sword and Shield, Eevee received a unique Gigantamax form with access to the unique G-Max Move G-Max Cuddle, which deals damage and infatuates opponents of the opposite gender.

In 2018, remakes of Pokémon Yellow, Pokémon: Let's Go, Eevee! and Pokémon: Let's Go, Pikachu! were released. Unlike in the original Pokémon Yellow game in which Pikachu was the only Pokémon able to walk around with the player outside its Pokéball, in Let's Go, Eevee! the player's partner and starter Pokémon Eevee refuses a Pokéball and stays with the player in the overworld. The partner eevee is able to wear accessories and clothes and "hairstyles" which are visible in the overworld. Like Pikachu, in Let's Go: Eevee, the partner Eevee refuses to evolve, but is able to learn special moves not available in other games, with eight possible moves each based on one of Eevee's evolutions. Game developer Junichi Masuda said that Eevee was chosen for the remake because of its popularity in fan art, although Psyduck was also considered before it was decided its colouring was too similar to Pikachu.

Outside of the main series, Eevee is a photographable Pokémon in Pokémon Snap. In Pokémon Stadium 2, Eevee stars in its own minigame called "Eager Eevee". Players have to run around in circles while Aipom raises and lowers a cover on berries. The object is to be among the first to grab some of the berries. It also appeared in Pokémon Pinball, Pokémon Channel, Pokémon Trozei!, Pokémon Mystery Dungeon: Blue Rescue Team and Red Rescue Team, Pokémon Mystery Dungeon: Explorers of Sky, Pokémon Ranger: Shadows of Almia, My Pokémon Ranch, Pokémon Rumble, Pokémon Mystery Dungeon: Adventure Team, PokéPark Wii: Pikachu's Adventure, Pokémon Ranger: Guardian Signs, Pokémon Rumble Blast, Pokémon Conquest, Pokémon Mystery Dungeon: Gates to Infinity, Pokémon Rumble U, Pokémon Battle Trozei, Pokémon Rumble World, Pokémon Picross, Pokémon Rumble Rush, Pokémon Mystery Dungeon: Rescue Team DX, Pokémon Shuffle ,Pokémon Masters EX, Pokkén Tournament, Pokémon Go, Pokémon Unite and New Pokémon Snap.

In the anime
In the anime, Eevee first appeared in The Battling Eevee Brothers. A little boy named Mikey was hiding the Evolution Pokémon from his three older brothers because they wanted him to evolve it. However, when Mikey's Eevee single-handedly defeated Team Rocket, they were able to accept the fact that Mikey wanted to keep his Eevee just the way it is. Ash's longtime rival Gary Oak uses an Eevee of great quality that eventually evolves into Umbreon. The Kimono Girls who first appeared in the Pokémon Gold and Silver games, make an appearance with their Pokémon (all of which are evolutions of Eevee) in Trouble's Brewing. The youngest of the Kimono girls had an unevolved Eevee (the only of the sisters to have one) in this episode, though it later evolved into an Espeon later on in the episode "Espeon, Not Included". May has an Eevee that hatched from an egg, which she used in Pokémon Contests all across the Kanto region. When May traveled to Sinnoh, she took it to Route 217 to evolve into a Glaceon. In the XY series, Serena also acquired an Eevee of her own which evolved into a Sylveon. In Sun and Moon, Lana herself got a shaggy haired Eevee nicknamed Sandy.

A special Eevee, one which is incapable of evolving, is owned by Chloe Cerise, the childhood friend of Goh, who is Ash Ketchum's companion in the 23rd, 24th, and 25th seasons of the anime. The main reason why it cannot evolve is unknown, but the head of the Eevee Evolution Lab in the episode "To Train or Not to Train!" theorises that it cannot evolve because of its hesitancy of making the important decision.

In the film
Eevee has appeared for a short time in Detective Pikachu, under the ownership of Howard Clifford. It then was forced to evolve into Flareon.

In other media
In Pokémon Adventures, Red is in possession of an Eevee which had been experimented on by Team Rocket. As a result, it could transform back and forth from the three evolutions Vaporeon, Jolteon, and Flareon along with its base form, allowing it greater tactical ability in fighting other Pokémon. Eventually, it evolved into an Espeon, losing its special ability to interchange abilities. In the Electric Tale of Pikachu manga, the character Mikey (who appeared in the anime episode: "The Battling Eevee Brothers") makes an appearance with his own Eevee and within the chapter that he appears in, Mikey attempts to prove to his brothers that he doesn't need to evolve his Eevee to win battles.

In the crowdsourced social experiment, Twitch Plays Pokémon, an Eevee was the source of much frustration when, while trying to evolve it into a Vaporeon to learn the move Surf, the players accidentally used a Fire Stone on it, evolving it into a Flareon. This setback led to Flareon being called the "false prophet" and became one of the most famous moments of the event.

Promotion and reception
Since its debut appearance, Eevee and its evolutions have received generally positive reception. GamesRadar described Eevee as "one of the cutest and most varied of all Pokémon", and in a later article described it as one of the most "enduringly popular". IGN called it "the most mystifying, peculiar, eccentric, and adaptable creature in the game." IGN editor “Pokémon of the Day Chick" also stated that Eevee was a creature "a thousand times cuter than a puppy" and she also stated that its evolutions were also "powerful for a cute Pokémon". IGN's Jack DeVries cited Eevee as "one of the cutest Pokémon". Eevee was noted as one of the most popular Pokémon at the offices of The Pokémon Company. Author Loredana Lipperini noted Eevee as being one of the "most mysterious Pokémon in the series". Technology Tell writer Jenni Lada noted that Eevee is a character "whom should feature" in Super Smash Bros., citing its customization "potential". Liz Finnegan of The Escapist listed Eevee as their eleventh favorite Pokémon, stating that Eevee is like the evolutionary equivalent of the turducken. Gita Jackson of Kotaku claimed that Eevee is what Pokémon is all about, stating that "Eevee is adorable, but that’s not the only reason why I love them. Somewhere between a cat and a dog, Eevee seems more domesticated than longtime series mascot Pikachu, but still as mischievous as any other wild animal."

In 2015, Eevee was the most traded Pokémon in the games' "Wonder Trade" feature. A special Pokémon Omega Ruby and Alpha Sapphire Online Competition known as the "Eevee Friendly Match" limits participants' Pokémon to Eevee and its evolutions only. In a list of the "Top 10 Cutest Video Game Characters", Eevee was ranked fourth, with Screw Attack's Prowler64 writing: "There are many cute Pokémon, but in my opinion, Eevee is the cutest and makes it onto this list."

Due to its popularity, Eevee (and its evolutions) have frequently been used in much of the Pokémon merchandising, such as toys. Eevee is a part of a set of Pokémon figures released for Pokémon Rumble U, with IGN labelling it as a "fan favourite". While Eevee and its evolutions have appeared in the Pokémon Trading Card Game as common cards, they were featured in the releases of the Majestic Dawn and Evolving Skies sets. A special Eevee-themed Nintendo 3DS XL was released in Japan in celebration of the 15th anniversary of Pokémon Centre retail establishments. Eevee has also been a part of various Nintendo events, which allow the players to obtain special Pokémon that are being distributed (one example in Eevee's case was a shiny Eevee distribution). Eevee was also one of the several first generation Pokémon to get a special DVD (Volume 6) with episodes starring itself during the 10th anniversary of the Pokémon franchise.

References

External links

 Eevee on Bulbapedia
 Eevee on Pokemon.com

Pokémon species
Video game characters introduced in 1996
Video game mascots

ca:Línia evolutiva d'Eevee#Eevee
fi:Luettelo Pokémon-lajeista (121–151)#Eevee